The 1989 Philippine Basketball Association (PBA) rookie draft was an event at which teams drafted players from the amateur ranks. The draft was held on February 6, 1989.

Round 1

Round 2

Round 3

Round 4

Undrafted players
Silverio Palad, III
Joselito Martin
Joseph Pelaez
George Ella
Junel Baculi

References

Philippine Basketball Association draft
draft
PBA draft